Please Don't Eat the Babies (also known as Island Fury) is a 1983 American horror and thriller film directed by Bruce Geller. This film has been music composed by Larry Wolff. The film starring Robyn Leigh Hadem Elizabeth Monet, Tanya Louise, Michael Wayne, Mike Jacobs, Joe Lombardo and Ross Hamilton in the lead roles.

Cast
 Elizabeth Monet
 Tanya Louise
 Michael Wayne
 Mike Jacobs
 Joe Lombardo
 Ross Hamilton
 Hank Worden
 Ed McClarty
 Robin Haden

References

External links
 
 

1983 films
Films shot in Los Angeles
1983 horror films
1980s erotic films
American erotic horror films
1980s English-language films
1980s American films